was a town located in Nakakanbara District, Niigata Prefecture, Japan.

As of 2003, the town had an estimated population of 11,339 and a density of 480.06 inhabitants per km². The total area was 23.62 km².

On March 21, 2005, Yoskogoshi, along with the cities of Niitsu, Shirone and Toyosaka, the towns of Kameda and Kosudo (all from Nakakanbara District), the town of Nishikawa, and the villages of Ajikata, Iwamuro, Katahigashi, Nakanokuchi and Tsukigata (all from Nishikanbara District), was merged into the expanded city of Niigata. Since April 1, 2007, the area has been part of the Kōnan-ku ward.

See also
 Kōnan-ku, Niigata
 Niigata, Niigata

External links
 Niigata Kōnan-ku website 
 Welcome to Konan Ward - Niigata City 

Dissolved municipalities of Niigata Prefecture
2005 disestablishments in Japan